Leon Vranken (born 1975, Maaseik, Belgium) is a Belgian artist. He lives and works in Antwerp (Belgium).

Biography and works
Leon Vranken's work is radical in its simplicity and pays tremendous attention to material and finish, expressing both tension and calm. He interweaves expectation with technical expertise. With a background in landscape architecture, after his artistic education in Situ at the Royal Academy of Fine Arts in Antwerp, he has devoted his energies to the visual arts. His diverse works– sculptures, installations, photos or interventions – are mainly developed in interaction with space. Vranken completed his education at the Higher Institute for Fine Arts in Ghent in 2007, and has had international exhibitions in cities including New York, Londen and Toronto.

Leon Vranken is always able to disrupt direct visual recognisability by depriving everyday objects of their function and deliberately using various materials. One could describe his work as sculptural trompe l'oeils, alluring yet misleading configurations. Geometric ensembles, sophisticated sculptures and fake ready-mades are painstakingly orchestrated in space. Shape, presentation and meaning slide continuously over each other like tectonic plates. With his spatial compositions the artist defies gravity, the viewer and the medium. The image enters into dialogue with the frame, the sculpture with the pedestal.

Solo exhibitions

2015
 ( 1³ ) ² = 1, LLS 387 ruimte voor actuele kunst, Antwerp (Belgium)
 Art Geneva, Geneva (Switzerland)

2014
 Paper, Scissors, Stone, Z33, Hasselt (Belgium)

2013
 A Cat's Eye Perspective, Meessen De Clercq, Brussels (Belgium)

2011
 Don't whistle 'till you're out of the wood, White Box, New York (USA)

2010
 The Beauty of Painting (Chapter I), Concertgebouw, Brugge (Belgium)

2009
 The Travelling Riddle, Stella Lohaus Gallery, Antwerpen (Belgium)

2007
 The Garden with the Two-forked Paths, Diaz Contemporary, Toronto (Canada)
 Verger Barré, Maes en Matthys Gallery, Antwerpen (Belgium)

References

Sources

External links
 Official website

Living people
1975 births
People from Maaseik
Belgian sculptors
21st-century Belgian artists